Anthony Levine Sr. (born March 27, 1987), nicknamed "Co-Cap", is a former American football strong safety who played in the National Football League (NFL) for 12 seasons, primarily with the Baltimore Ravens. He played college football at Tennessee State.

Early years
Levine spent the first 14 years of his life in Abbeville, Louisiana. He then moved to North Carolina where he played football, basketball, and track while he attended Richard J. Reynolds High School in Winston-Salem. Levine helped the Reynolds Track Team win the North Carolina State Championship his senior year.

Professional career

Green Bay Packers
Levine was signed by the Packers as an undrafted free agent on May 3, 2010. Levine spent two seasons on the Packers' practice squad before being released during 2012 roster cuts.

Baltimore Ravens

Levine was signed to the Ravens' practice squad on September 3, 2012 and was promoted to the active roster on November 17. He was placed on injured reserve on November 26 after his first NFL game in which he recorded one special teams tackle.

In 2013, Levine played in all 16 games finishing second on the team with 11 special teams tackles. In 2014, Levine played in all 16 games with three starts playing at both safety and cornerback recording 23 tackles and four passes defensed.

Levine signed a two-year $2.4 million contract extension with the Ravens on March 12, 2015.

On March 10, 2017, Levine signed a three-year contract extension with the Ravens. He played in all 16 games in 2017, recording 29 combined tackles, three pass deflections, and his first career interception. In 2018, Levine played in all 16 games, recording 28 combined tackles, an interception, and a career-high eight pass deflections. In the 2019 regular season opener, Levine took a fake punt for a 60-yard carry in the 59–10 victory over the Miami Dolphins. In the 2019 season, Levine appeared in all 16 games and recorded eight total tackles, one tackle-for-loss, and three quarterback hits to go along with contributing on special teams.

On March 26, 2020, Levine re-signed with the Ravens.

Levine re-signed on a one-year contract with the team again on April 9, 2021.

On January 26, 2022, Levine announced his retirement through the Ravens' social media channels. Levine also announced that he would be taking up a scouting and coaching assistant role with the Ravens.

Personal life
Levine is the son of Christina Levine and Lawrence Brannon. Levine has three sisters: Alisio Levine (former Miss Abbeville 2010), Cassie Brannon, and Angelle Brannon. He also has two brothers, Dwayne Levine and Wade Levine, both from Abbeville. Levine is the cousin of former NFL player Brandon Mitchell.

References

External links

Baltimore Ravens bio

1987 births
Living people
People from Abbeville, Louisiana
Players of American football from Winston-Salem, North Carolina
Green Bay Packers players
Baltimore Ravens players
American football safeties
American football cornerbacks
Tennessee State Tigers football players
Players of American football from Louisiana